Parshottam Khodabhai Rupala (born 1 October 1954) is an Indian politician and Minister of Fisheries, Animal Husbandry and Dairying in the Second Modi ministry. He is a member of Rajya Sabha, representing the Indian state of Gujarat and a leader of Bharatiya Janata Party. He was a former member of Gujarat Legislative Assembly from Amreli and formerly served as a minister in Government of Gujarat.

Early life
Rupala was born to Hariben Khodabhai and Khodabhai Madhabhai, on 1 October 1954. Rupala earned his B.Sc. and B.Ed. He studied at Saurashtra University and Gujarat University in 1976–1977.

Before entering politics, he served as School Principal at Hamapur in Medium School from 1977 to 1983. He was the chief officer of the Amreli municipality from November 1983 to March 1987.
[{Caste}] kurmi Patidar

Career
Rupala was the president of the Amreli district Bhartiya Janta Party from 1988 to 1991. This led to his service as Secretary of the Bhartiya Janta Party in 1992.

He was Chairman of a youth hostel from February 2002 to 2004. He served as trustee of Kadva Patidar trust, in Amreli, Chairman of Madad Trust and President of the Gujarat electricity board union.

He served 3 consecutive terms as a member of Gujarat Legislative Assembly ending in 2002.

He was a Cabinet Minister in Narmada for Irrigation and Water Supply from 19 March 1995 to 20 October 1995 and again from 4 November 1995 to 18 September 1996; for Agriculture from 9 October 2001 to 21 December 2002. He chaired the Public Accounts Committee of Gujarat Legislative Assembly from March 1997 to December 1997.

He was the Chairman of Gujarat Industrial Development Corporation (G.I.D.C.) from June 1998 to October 2001.

He was elected a Rajya Sabha Member (2008-2009) where he served on the Committee on Food, Consumer Affairs and Public Distribution Member (Aug. 2009 - Aug. 2010), on the Committee on Personnel, Public Grievances, Law and Justice Member ( July 2010 -), on the Committee for the Ministry of Shipping Member (Sept. 2010 -) and on the Committee on Chemicals and Fertilizers Member, Committee on Agriculture (Aug. 2012 -).

He was again elected to Rajya Sabha in June 2016 in by-poll following death of sitting Congress MP Praveen Rashtrapal. From May 2019 to July 2021, he served as the Minister of State in the Ministry of Agriculture and Farmers Welfare. In July 2021, he became Minister of Fisheries, Animal Husbandry and Dairying.

Personal life
Rupala married Savitaben in 1979. They have a daughter and one son.

References

External links 

 

People from Amreli district
1954 births
Living people
Gujarat MLAs 1990–1995
Rajya Sabha members from Gujarat
Gujarat MLAs 1998–2002
Gujarat MLAs 1995–1998
Narendra Modi ministry
Bharatiya Janata Party politicians from Gujarat
Gujarat University alumni